Eduard Mössmer (21 February 1934 – 20 April 2007) was an Austrian ice hockey player. He competed in the men's tournament at the 1964 Winter Olympics.

References

1934 births
2007 deaths
Austrian ice hockey players
Olympic ice hockey players of Austria
Ice hockey players at the 1964 Winter Olympics
Place of birth missing